Ländchen Friesack is a small ridge, up to 77 metres above sea level (NN). It is situated in Brandenburg, northwest of Germany's capital city, Berlin and southwest of the town of Friesack. The Ländchen (German for "small land" or "little territory") extends for just under 5 kilometres in a north-south direction and separates the lowland and former marshes of the Rhinluch in the north from that of the Havelland Luch in the south. The upland is almost entirely forested. It is divided into the parishes of Friesack, Kleßen-Görne and Mühlenberge. Part of the Ländchen – around the lake of Görner See – is a nature reserve.

References

Literature 

Havelland
Landforms of Brandenburg
Hill ranges of Germany